Steven Holmes (born 10 August 1971) is an Australian former professional rugby league footballer who played in the 1990s.

Playing career
After playing for Townsville in the Foley Shield, Holmes joined the North Queensland Cowboys in 1995 for their inaugural season. Holmes made his first grade debut in Round 4 and would play five games for the season, kicking two goals. In Round 8, Holmes started at fullback in the club's first victory, a 14–10 win over the Illawarra Steelers.

In 1997, Holmes played in England for Hull Sharks, helping the team win promotion to the Super League.

References

1971 births
Living people
Australian rugby league players
Rugby league fullbacks
Rugby league players from Townsville
North Queensland Cowboys players
Hull F.C. players